Marek Biegun (born 5 November 1958) is a Polish footballer. He played in one match for the Poland national football team in 1985.

References

External links
 

1958 births
Living people
Polish footballers
Poland international footballers
People from Oświęcim
Association football defenders
GKS Katowice players